Szreńsk  is a village in Mława County, Masovian Voivodeship, in east-central Poland. It is the seat of the gmina (administrative district) called Gmina Szreńsk.

The village has a population of 1,200.

References

External links 
 Jewish Community in Szreńsk on Virtual Shtetl

Villages in Mława County
Płock Governorate
Warsaw Voivodeship (1919–1939)